The north-east coast drainage division or north-east coast basin is the area of Queensland between the Great Dividing Range and the Pacific Ocean. It lies between Torres Strait and an arbitrary line drawn along the Queensland - New South Wales border.  In the north it meets the Gulf of Carpentaria basin to its west while further south lies the Lake Eyre Basin and the Murray-Darling Basin.  In the south the Australian south-east coast drainage division continues to the east of the Great Divide.

The basin covers 450,705 km2 across 46 river catchments.  It is the seventh largest out of twelve separate drainage divisions covering Mainland Australia.  Just under one half of all Australian freshwater species are found in the north east coast division.

See also

 Southwest corner of Western Australia
 Indian Ocean drainage division: see Pilbara region of Western Australia
 Timor Sea drainage division: see Top End and Kimberley region of Western Australia
 South Australian gulf drainage division
 Western Plateau

References

External links
north-east coast drainage division at the Biodiversity Information Resources and Data

North-east coast drainage division